Kosmos 1171 ( meaning Cosmos 1171) was a satellite which was used as a target for tests of anti-satellite weapons. It was launched by the Soviet Union in 1980 as part of the Dnepropetrovsk Sputnik programme, and used as a target for Kosmos 1174, as part of the Istrebitel Sputnikov programme.

It was launched aboard a Kosmos-3M carrier rocket, from Site 132/2 at the Plesetsk Cosmodrome. The launch occurred at 07:40 UTC on 3 April 1980.

It was to have been intercepted by Kosmos 1174 on 18 April, however the interceptor malfunctioned and missed the target. Two further attempts over the next two days also failed, before the interceptor was commanded to self-destruct. As of 2009, Kosmos 1171 is still in orbit.

Kosmos 1171 was the eighth of ten Lira satellites to be launched, of which all but the first were successful. Lira was derived from the earlier DS-P1-M satellite, which it replaced.

See also

1980 in spaceflight

References

Spacecraft launched in 1980
Kosmos satellites
Dnepropetrovsk Sputnik program